Innosense was an American girl group that were together from 1997 to 2003.

History
The band was managed by Lou Pearlman and Lynn Harless (mother of Justin Timberlake). The original members were Danay Ferrer, Britney Spears, Mandy Ashford, Nikki DeLoach, and Amanda Latona. The group was  formed in 1997. Their name was suggested by Pearlman and Harless. The band decided to misspell the name so they would not sound like "innocent little four-year-olds." Their inspirations were bands such as NSYNC and Backstreet Boys. Ashford was a member of the Attache show choir, along with high-school friend Lance Bass, with whom she also shared a vocal coach. Bass recommended Ashford to Pearlman, and she was selected to join the band. Later that same year, Spears decided to go solo and was later replaced by Veronica Finn.

Latona left the band to go solo, and was replaced by Jenny Morris. Before she left, Innosense released one single, titled "Wherever You Are". A video for the song was released in Germany in 1998. Amanda Latona signed a solo contract with J Records and recorded "Can't Take It Back" (2002) and "Do You Still" (2003). Neither single did well, and she was later dropped from the label. Latona dated Backstreet Boy A.J. McLean. She was featured in 2002 in "Who's That Girl?", an article in The New York Times Magazine. The article chronicles J Records' grooming of Latona's career in an attempt to ensure her success.

In 2001, Innosense appeared in the teen movie Longshot. Spears also appeared in the movie, but not with the rest of the group. When Spears' solo career began, Innosense became an opening act for her tour. 

The band released one album, whose  lead single, "Say No More", hit #20 on Billboards Hot Singles Sales chart, but never charted on the Billboard Hot 100. The album itself never charted and as a result never found commercial success. 

In 2001, Morris left the group, which left them as a quartet. 

The second and final single from the album, "Rain Rain", was released only in Germany in 2002; however, it failed to chart. 

Innosense disbanded in 2003 to work on separate projects. 

Ashford has modeled in several publications, including Playboy magazine, and also served as a spokesmodel. DeLoach, an actress before Innosense, returned to acting with regular roles in such TV series as North Shore, Windfall, and most notably, as the mother of the lead character in MTV's Awkward.

Latona became a professional bodybuilder, entering her first contest in 2003.

Members
Britney Spears (1997)
Danay Ferrer (1997–2003)
Mandy Ashford (1997–2003)
Nikki DeLoach (1997–2003)
Amanda Latona (1997–1999)
Veronica Finn (1997–2003)
Jenny Morris (1999–2001)

Discography

Albums
So Together (2000)

Extended plays
 Wherever You Are (1998)

Singles
 "Say No More" (2000)
 "Rain Rain" (2002)

Other contributions
 "This Must Be Love" on Millionaire Dogs (1999)
 "Wishing On Every Star" (Michael Garvin; Robin Wyley) on Longshot soundtrack (2001)
 "To Know the Unknown" on Pokémon 3: The Movie Soundtrack (2001)
 "King of the Lollapat" with Take 5 and Billy Crawford on Christmas That Almost Wasn't (2001)

References

External links
 innosensemusic.com

American dance music groups
American pop girl groups
American pop music groups
Britney Spears
Musical groups established in 1997
Musical groups disestablished in 2003
Musical groups from Orlando, Florida
1997 establishments in Florida
Sony Music artists
Jive Records artists
RCA Records artists